Guy Texereau (14 May 1935 – 28 April 2001) was a French long-distance runner. He competed in the marathon at the 1968 Summer Olympics.

References

1935 births
2001 deaths
Athletes (track and field) at the 1960 Summer Olympics
Athletes (track and field) at the 1964 Summer Olympics
Athletes (track and field) at the 1968 Summer Olympics
French male long-distance runners
French male marathon runners
Olympic athletes of France
Sportspeople from Deux-Sèvres